Between Earth and Sky may refer to:

 Between Earth and Sky (album), a 2001 album by the band Rhea's Obsession
 Between Earth and Sky (novel series), a 2020-2021 epic fantasy novel series by Rebecca Roanhorse